Man Underground is a 2016 science fiction film written and directed by Michael Borowiec and Sam Marine.

Cast
 George Basil as Willem Koda
 Andy Rocco as Todd Muckle
 Pamela Fila as Flossie Ferguson
 Felix Hagen as Francis
 Stephen Girasuolo as Stan Bowman
 Eleanor Hutchins as Lorraine

Plot
A conspiracy theorist enlists people from his small town to help him make a film about his experiences encountering aliens while working as a US government geologist.

References

External links

American independent films
2016 films
American science fiction films
2010s English-language films
2010s American films